Santa Rosa de Sacco District is one of ten districts of the province Yauli in Peru.

References